Founded in 1947, Monarch Beverage Company is Indiana's largest distributor of beer and wine. The Indianapolis-based company represents more than 500 brands and employs over 600 Hoosiers.

History

In 1947, Edwin T. French Sr. founded Monarch Beverage Company in Indianapolis, IN. The company originated with six employees and distributed only one brand of beer, Carling Black Label, from a warehouse the size of a medium home. In 1971, the distribution of wine began with E & J Gallo brands, followed by the distribution of Miller Brewing Company products in 1989 and the Coors Brewing Company brands in 1991.

Since the founding of Monarch Beverage, the company has grown substantially, acquiring 26 smaller distributors since 1975 and now servicing the entire state of Indiana with a variety of beverage products.

Leadership
Phillip A. Terry - Vice President and CEO
John Xenos - General Manager
Fred Dufour - Senior Vice President of Operations
Natalie Roberts - Senior Vice President of Strategy
Scott Shipley - Senior Vice President of Sales
Dave Rogers - Director of Beer Sales
Ben Francis - Director of Wine Sales
Todd Lebo - Director of Human Resources

References

Drink companies of the United States
Companies based in Indianapolis
Food and drink companies based in Indiana